Ostra is a town and comune in the Marche, central Italy, near the modern Ostra Vetere, south-east of Senigallia.

The original name of the town was Montalboddo. In 1881 the name was changed to Ostra, like the ancient Roman city located near the modern town of Ostra.

Ancient Ostra
Ancient Ostra was situated between the modern town of Ostra and Ostra Vetere and was inhabited from the 3rd century BC until the 6th century AD.

Neither town survived beyond the classical period. Though Ostra is little mentioned by ancient authors, excavations there have brought to light remains of various buildings and several inscriptions.

Geography
Modern Ostra lies on a hill over the Misa river valley. It is the most important town in the valley upstream from Senigallia, lying  from the Adriatic coast.

Main sights

Piazza dei Martiri
At the heart of the town is Piazza dei Martiri (Martyrs' square) the most important square in the town. Here also are the municipal building with its arches and its marble staircase and the St. Francis' Church, built in the 13th century.

Defensive wall 
It still has nine great towers and two main entrances.

Madonna della Rosa Sanctuary
Located a few hundreds metres out of town, this Sanctuary devoted to Holy Mary is one of the most important in Italy, visited every year by many pilgrims coming both from Italy and Europe. It has been built in 1754 after Holy Mary appeared to a young girl and fosters a miraculous image of the Virgin.

Twin towns
  Markt Schwaben, Germany

References

Cities and towns in the Marche